Lars Hallström (born 23 January 1976) is a retired Swedish ice hockey player. Hallström was part of the Djurgården Swedish champions' team of 2000. Hallström made 125 Elitserien appearances for Djurgården.

References

External links

1976 births
Djurgårdens IF Hockey players
Living people
Swedish ice hockey left wingers
Ice hockey people from Stockholm